This list of South American animals extinct in the Holocene features animals known to have become extinct in the last 12,000 years on the South American continent. The list includes animal extinctions in the Galápagos, Falklands, and other islands near the continent, but not Easter Island (politically part of Chile) which is considered in the List of Oceanian animals extinct in the Holocene, nor Caribbean islands which are on the List of Antillian and Bermudan animals extinct in the Holocene.

Many extinction dates are unknown due to a lack of relevant information.

Mammals

Possible 
N.B.: These animals were identified "from Late Pleistocene to Early Holocene" deposits in BrazilGhilardi, A. M., Fernandes, M. A., & Bichuette, M. E. (2011). "Megafauna from the Late Pleistocene-Holocene deposits of the Upper Ribeira karst area, southeast Brazil". Quaternary International, 245 (2), 369-378. and Argentina, but without direct Holocene datation.

Prehistoric

Recent

Birds

<br/ >

Reptiles

Amphibians

Fish

Echinoderms

Insects

Earthworms

Molluscs

<br/ >

See also
 List of North American animals extinct in the Holocene
 Lists of extinct species
 List of extinct bird species since 1500
 Extinct in the wild
 Lazarus taxon

Notes

References

External links
 The Extinction Website
 IUCN Red List of Threatened Species

SA

South America
Extinct animals
†Holocene